The 1984 America East men's basketball tournament was hosted by the higher seeds in head-to-head matchups. The final was held at Matthews Arena on the campus of the Northeastern University. Northeastern gained its third overall America East Conference Championship and an automatic berth to the NCAA tournament with its win over Canisius College. Northeastern was given the 11th seed in the East Regional of the NCAA Tournament and lost in the first round against Virginia Commonwealth 70–69.

Bracket and Results

See also
America East Conference

References

America East Conference men's basketball tournament
1983–84 ECAC North men's basketball season